Hang Nadim International Airport  is an international airport located in Batam, Riau Islands, Indonesia. It is named after Laksamana Hang Nadim Pahlawan Kechik, a legendary warrior from the region. The airport is the primary method of transport to and from Batam, alongside ferries to neighboring islands, including the sovereign city-state Singapore in the north.

The airport has the largest runway in Indonesia and the second-longest runway in Southeast Asia.

By the end of May 2014, it was the sixth airport in Indonesia to operate 24 hours a day. The move was the result of many airlines making the airport a hub for their operations. Lion Air has developed a base at the airport as Soekarno–Hatta International Airport is severely congested. The airport also has an aircraft maintenance facility which is gradually transforming into a hub for aircraft maintenance.

In March 2021, a PPP for the expansion of the airport was awarded to a consortium of Angkasa Pura I, Incheon International Airport Corporation and state-owned construction company PT Wijaya Karya. The 25 year concession includes the improvement of passenger and cargo terminal facilities.

Airlines and destinations

Passenger

Cargo

Expansion plan
BP Batam, the airport operator, plans to expand and improve infrastructure with a massive project costing US$448 million. The new terminal will be the second terminal of the airport. The existing terminal will be expanded from a capacity of 4 million passengers per year to 8 million passengers per year, with 6 jetbridges. The new terminal will also able to hold up to 8 million passengers (first phase) per year, with 8 jetbridges. In total, the terminals will have a capacity of 16 million passengers per year and 14 jetbridges. Garuda Indonesia, Lion Air, and Incheon International Airport will also help BP Batam, the airport owner and operator, in developing the new terminal.

The planned Aerocity will cover an area of 1,763 hectares, with the airport, logistics, central business district (CBD) and the aviation industry being integrated under one business concept. The development plan for the airport includes designs for various facilities such as golf courses, hotels, retail facilities, recreation centers, a convention center, offices for e-commerce and telecommunications, logistics and a monorail; it is designed to turn Batam into a business travel destination and Aeropolis.

Aircraft maintenance
Recently the airport has become an important hub for the aircraft maintenance, repair, and overhaul (MRO) industry. In the long term, Hang Nadim Airport is planned to be developed into an Aeropolis covering an area of 1,800 hectares. Lion Air's subsidiary Batam Aero Technic (BAT) has invested in Hang Nadim by building MRO facilities. BAT plans to expand the existing hangar to 28 hectares to accommodate as many as 250 aircraft.

Garuda Indonesia's aircraft maintenance unit, GMF AeroAsia, Lion Air Group and  Batam Aero Technic announced a joint venture to build an MRO facility in Batam to compete with neighboring Singapore.

Traffics and statistics

Statistics

Incidents
On August 9, 2017 the Head of Batam Airport Hang Nadim Suwarso confirmed that a large hole measuring 12 meters by 5 meters by 2 meters deep on a taxiway had caused the surface of the asphalt layer to collapse. This was the second reported accident of soil collapse at the airport.

On May 5, 2010, a 12m diameter hole was created when the surface collapsed beside a runway. Airport authorities blamed the incident on corroded steel structures supporting the drainage culverts.

Gallery

References

External links

Hang Nadim Badan Pengusahaan Batam Airport at Batam Industrial Development Association (BIDA) website

Batam
Airports in the Riau Islands